Podchybie  is a village in the administrative district of Gmina Trzyciąż, within Olkusz County, Lesser Poland Voivodeship, in southern Poland.

The village has an approximate population of 160.

References

Podchybie